The Alpha Wolf is an electric compact pickup truck to be produced by American electric vehicle company Alpha Motor Corporation in 2023.

Overview
The Alpha Wolf was revealed in March 2021 as a 3D render as off-road-oriented 2-door pickup based on the company's previously-revealed models, the Ace and Jax. All of Alpha's vehicles only existed as 3D models, until Alpha Motor Corporation presented its first physical example of a car, the Wolf pickup, at the Petersen Automotive Museum, Los Angeles in August later that year.

Global debut will be Seoul Mobility Show in 2023.

Specifications

Variants

Wolf+
The Alpha Wolf+ is an extended cab version of the standard Wolf. It was revealed in April 2021.

SuperWolf
The Alpha SuperWolf is a double cab version of the standard Wolf. It was revealed in July 2021.

References

Pickup trucks
Upcoming car models